The Charleston Museum is a museum located in the Wraggborough neighborhood in Charleston, South Carolina. It is the oldest museum in the United States. Its highly regarded collection includes historic artifacts, natural history, decorative arts and two historic Charleston houses. It replaces the Old Charleston Museum that burned down due to unknown causes.

History
The Charleston Museum was founded in 1773 and opened to the public in 1824. Other museums in the category of oldest in the United States include the Peabody Essex Museum in Salem, Massachusetts and the American Philosophical Society in Philadelphia. 

In 1920, when the museum hired Laura Bragg as its director, she became the first woman to direct a publicly-funded art museum in America.

The museum's present building was completed in 1980 at 360 Meeting Street, Charleston, South Carolina.

The museum's exhibits include natural history and local history displays and decorative arts, including silver. The museum is also home to the only known fossil of the extinct Pelagornis sandersi, which is possibly the largest flying bird ever discovered.  The museum also owns and operates two historic house museums:
 Heyward-Washington House – late 18th-century house owned by Founding Father Thomas Heyward, Jr., Revolutionary patriot and signer of the Declaration of Independence. It is best known as the lodging of President George Washington during his 1792 visit to Charleston.
 Joseph Manigault House – Federal-style home decorated with American, English and French furnishing of the early 19th century
In addition to the two houses, the museum also maintains The Dill Sanctuary. From the site:
"... located on James Island contains assorted habitats for wildlife and numerous cultural features including three earthen Confederate batteries and prehistoric, colonial, antebellum, and postbellum archaeological sites. The Dill Sanctuary has been protected for purposes of preservation, wildlife enhancement, research and education, and is used only for Museum-sponsored programs. Habitat has been enhanced by creation of a six-acre wildlife pond, with three nesting islands, which provides a reliable source of fresh water for animals and nesting sites for both migratory and resident birds. 2001 saw the construction of the Dill Education Center and bathroom facilities which hosts Museum education programs."

Collection strengths
 Charleston furniture
 Charleston silver
 Lowcountry textiles, including costumes, quilts, and needlework
 South Carolina ceramics
 Egyptian artifacts
 Archives - documentary and photographic resources
 South Carolina ornithology
 Nineteenth-century firearms
 Invertebrate and Vertebrate Paleontology Collections
 Skeletal Reconstructions of various Vertebrate Groups
 Rocks and Minerals from around the World
 Numerous Plant and Animal species collected by local Naturalists.

References

External links
 Charleston Museum - official site

Museums in Charleston, South Carolina
History museums in South Carolina
Museums established in 1773
Natural history museums in South Carolina
1773 establishments in South Carolina
Paleontology in South Carolina